John Walker (February 13, 1744December 2, 1809) was a public official from Virginia.

Biography
Walker was born in Virginia, the son of Dr. Thomas Walker. He received private education before attending the College of William and Mary, which he graduated from in 1764. He was a neighbor and classmate at William and Mary of Thomas Jefferson and they remained close friends until the elections of 1804-1805. In 1768 he was elected to the American Society. In 1772 he replaced his father as a representative of the House of Burgesses. He was in the Continental Army, serving in 1777 as an aide-de-camp to General George Washington, holding the rank of colonel. In 1780, he was elected as a delegate to the Continental Congress.  He then studied law. When William Grayson died in 1790, Walker was appointed to the United States Senate to serve from March 31 to November 9 of that year, when a successor was elected by the Virginia General Assembly.

Walker owned slaves. He died in 1809.

External links and references

Specific

1744 births
1809 deaths
People from Albemarle County, Virginia
American people of English descent
Continental Congressmen from Virginia
Pro-Administration Party United States senators from Virginia
House of Burgesses members
Virginia lawyers
American slave owners
18th-century American lawyers
College of William & Mary alumni
Continental Army officers from Virginia
United States senators who owned slaves